This is the discography of American rapper Curren$y.

Albums

Studio albums

Collaborative albums

Extended plays

Mixtapes

Singles

As lead artist

As featured artist

Other charted songs

Guest appearances

Music videos

References

Hip hop discographies
Discographies of American artists